Youth on Parade is a 1942 comedy musical film directed by Albert S. Rogell and starring John Hubbard, Ruth Terry, Martha O'Driscoll, Tom Brown, and Charles Smith.

Premise
A group of college students plan to create the perfect student as a joke. Unfortunately, their psychology professor finds out and is determined to meet her.

Cast
 John Hubbard as Prof. Gerald Payne
 Martha O'Driscoll as Sally Carlyle
 Ruth Terry as Patty Flynn?Betty Reilly
 Tom Brown as Bingo Brown
 Charles Smith as Willie Webster
 Nana Bryant as Agatha Frost
 Ivan F. Simpson as Dean Wharton
 Chick Chandler as Eddie Reilly
 Lynn Merrick as Emmy Lou Pipes
 Paul Fix as Nick Cramer

Accolades
"I've Heard That Song Before" was nominated for the AFI's 100 Years...100 Songs 2004 list.

References

External links
 
 
 
 

1942 musical comedy films
1942 films
American musical comedy films
1940s English-language films
Films directed by Albert S. Rogell
Films set in universities and colleges
Republic Pictures films
American black-and-white films
1940s American films